Gin is the third album by the Black Metal band Cobalt. It was released by Profound Lore in 2009. The album is dedicated to Ernest Hemingway (pictured in uniform on the cover), and Hunter S. Thompson. It was voted the second best album of 2009 by Terrorizer. The album was recorded at Flatline Audio, in Denver, Colorado.

Track listing

Credits
Erik Wunder - Vocals, Guitar, Bass, Drums
Phil McSorley - Vocals

References

2009 albums
Cobalt (band) albums